Meto Jovanovski may refer to:

 Meto Jovanovski (actor) (born 1946), Macedonian actor
 Meto Jovanovski (writer) (1928–2016), Macedonian writer